I Love, You Love is a 1989 Czechoslovak drama film directed by Dušan Hanák. It was entered into the 39th Berlin International Film Festival where Hanák won the Silver Bear for Best Director.

Cast
 Roman Kłosowski as Pista
 Milan Jelić as Vinco
 Iva Janžurová as Viera
 Milada Jezková as Mother
 Václav Babka as Albín
 Marie Motlová as Sida
 Ludovit Reiter
 Juraj Nvota as Jaro
 Ivan Palúch as Rudo
 Vera Bílá as Berta (as Bílá Viera)

References

External links

1989 films
1989 romantic drama films
Czechoslovak drama films
Slovak-language films
Films directed by Dušan Hanák
Czech romantic drama films
1980s Czech films